House at 205 North Main Street is a historic home located at Canastota in Madison County, New York.  It was built about 1870 in a small scale, eclectic adaptation of the Second Empire style.  The one story structure features a multi-gabled, flared mansard roof with polychrome slate shingles.

It was added to the National Register of Historic Places in 1986.

References

Houses on the National Register of Historic Places in New York (state)
Second Empire architecture in New York (state)
Houses completed in 1870
Houses in Madison County, New York
National Register of Historic Places in Madison County, New York